Ballynavenooragh is a stone fort and National Monument located in County Kerry, Ireland.

Location

The broader Ballynavenooragh group comprises 40 ringforts, 24 clocháns and 2 cillíní.

History 

This cashel (stone fort,  internal diameter) was in use in the 7th–10th centuries, with later reuse in the 13th century. It is similar to the cashel at Leacanabuaile.

It was excavated by Erin Gibbons in the late 1990s. A pit containing organic remains was found — apple, blackberry, hazelnut and grape seeds. Also found were stone tools, pottery, iron knives, a blue glass bead, crucible fragments, two 13th-century coins (silver pennies of Henry III) and two lathe-turned objects. Alder and willow were used for posts, apparently due to a lack of oak in the region.

Structures

The cashel contains two clocháns, a fireplace, souterrain and several postholes, and stepped terracing. The gateposts are formed by upright slabs.

References

Buildings and structures in County Kerry
Tourist attractions in County Kerry
National Monuments in County Kerry